Pipelines in Canada are important components of energy infrastructure in Canada as the majority of natural gas and oil deposits are located in landlocked Alberta and need to be transported to ports or terminals to access larger markets.

Professional associations
The Canadian Energy Pipeline Association (CEPA), whose 2019 members included Alliance Pipeline (natural gas), ATCO Pipelines (natural gas), Enbridge, Inter Pipeline, Pembina Pipeline (oil and natural gas), Plains All American Pipeline known also as Plains Midstream Canada, TC Energy (oil and natural gas), TransGas's TransGas Pipelines, Trans Mountain pipeline, Trans Northern Pipelines, and Calgary-based Calgary-based Wolf Midstream Inc.'s pipeline, was formed in 1993. CEPA members transporting most of the natural gas and crude oil from Canada to other North American markets. 

Since 2015, Chris Bloomer, a geoscientist, who had formerly served in executive positions at Shell Canada, Connacher Oil and Gas, and Petrobank Energy and Resources, replaced Brenda Kenny, who served as president and CEO since 2008. Since 2015, CEPA, has provided an interactive map of its members' pipelines in Canada, including those under construction or newly completed, such as the Trans Mountain pipeline, and TC Energy's Keystone Pipeline expansion—Keystone XL—and its Coastal GasLink Pipeline Project. 

According to their 2020 performance report, some of the issues upon which they focus include environmental issues including the impact of climate change, pipeline integrity, and emergency responses, relationships with First Nations communities, regulatory policy, as well as health and safety. 

In a September 30, 2020 Calgary Herald article, with the oil and gas industry experiencing the  COVID-19 pandemic economic slump, CEPA CEO Bloomer was cited as stressing that Canada needs to "tout" its  environmental, social and governance (ESG) performance in order to "attract new investment, expand oil and natural gas production, and get pipelines built".

Regulation and ownership

Regulation 
The Canadian federal government regulates around 10% (by length) of pipelines through the Canadian Energy Regulator. The Regulator has precedence over provincial regulation when pipelines cross provincial or international boundaries.

Provincially each provinces has its own regulator listed below:

Rejected and abandoned pipelines

Proposed pipelines

Operating pipelines

Gallery

References